TrySail are a Japanese girl group. The members of the group are Momo Asakura, Sora Amamiya and Shiina Natsukawa; all of them are also voice actresses who are all managed by Sony's Music Ray'n subdivision. Their February 2016 single "Whiz" reached the fourth place on the weekly Oricon Singles Chart, and was additionally used as the ending theme for the original net animation Koyomimonogatari.

In 2017, the group's single "Original" was used as the opening theme song for the anime Interviews with Monster Girls. TrySail moved from Aniplex to the new record label Sacra Music (both under Sony Music Entertainment Japan) in April 2017. Their single "Adrenaline!!!" is the ending theme of the anime Eromanga Sensei.

On 2018, the group released single "Wanted Girl", and "Truth.". Both songs are used as the second opening theme of Time Bokan 24 second season and the second opening theme of Beatless, respectively.　On January 1, 2019, "adrenaline!!!" was selected for the Heisei Anison Grand Prix Voice Actor Song Award (2010 - 2019). In 2020 and 2021, they released the singles "Gomakashi" and "Lapis" which were respectively used as the OP and ED for the Puella Magi Madoka Magica spinoff Magia Record: the group also provided voices for the three main characters. That same year, the group's members also appeared in the mixed-media project Idoly Pride, voicing the in-game group TRINITYAiLE.

Members
Momo Asakura, nicknamed Mocho (もちょ).
Sora Amamiya, nicknamed Sora-chan (天ちゃん) and Ten-chan (てんちゃん), since in Japanese, the kanji for her given name can also be read as "Ten".
Shiina Natsukawa, nickname Nansu (ナンス).

Discography

Studio albums

Singles

Collaborations singles

References

External links
 

Japanese girl groups
Japanese musical trios
Anime singers
Japanese vocal groups
New-age musicians
Sacra Music artists
Vocal trios